Germanium oxide may refer to:

Germanium dioxide, GeO2, the best known and most commonly encountered oxide of germanium containing germanium(IV)
Germanium monoxide, GeO, a stable but not well characterised compound containing germanium(II)